Danai Bhobho (born 1 December 1992) is a Zimbabwean footballer who plays as a defender. She has been a member of the Zimbabwe women's national team.

International career
Bhobho capped for Zimbabwe at senior level during the 2016 Africa Women Cup of Nations.

References

1992 births
Living people
Zimbabwean women's footballers
Women's association football defenders
Zimbabwe women's international footballers
Zimbabwean expatriate footballers
Zimbabwean expatriate sportspeople in Tanzania
Expatriate women's footballers in Tanzania